Ivarson may refer to:

People 
 Inge Ivarson (1917–2015), Swedish film producer and screenwriter
 Per Ivarson Undi (1803–1860), Norwegian-American homesteader in the Wisconsin Territory

Other 
 Ivarson USA LLC, an American manufacturing company

See also
 Iverson (disambiguation)
 Iversen (disambiguation)

Patronymic surnames